MLIP may refer to:
MLIP (gene)
 Mackenzie Large Igneous Province, geological area of Canada
Mili Airport, Marshall Islands, former(?) ICAO code MLIP